Bonanza High School is a high school in the Las Vegas Valley.  It was built in the 1970s and was the ninth high school to open in the area.

History
Bonanza opened in 1976, and is built in the same configuration as Eldorado High School, Basic High School and Vo-Tech high schools. Since it opened its doors in 1976 Bonanza has always been a large school with anywhere from 2000 to 3000+ students. However, with the city of Las Vegas growing faster than before,  bigger high schools were constructed to help resolve the over-crowding of schools.  In the 2004–2005 school year, many former Bonanza students were zoned to attend the newly opened Spring Valley High School

Athletics 

The Bonanza Bengals compete in Sunset 4A Region of the Nevada Interscholastic Activities Association (NIAA).

Fall Sports
Cross Country
Football
Women's Volleyball
Men's Soccer
Women's Golf
Men's and Women's Tennis
Winter Sports
Basketball
Wrestling
Women's Soccer
Women's Flag Football
Bowling
Spring Sports
Track
Baseball
Softball
Men's Golf
Boys’ Volleyball
Swimming and Diving

Bonanza's mascot is the Bengal.  When the school first opened in the 1970s it won many state championships in basketball, wrestling, volleyball, tennis, and golf. Today Bonanza Athletics are best known for its Tennis and Lacrosse programs, with the varsity Tennis team winning the 4A Nevada State Championship in 2001, 2002, 2003, 2005, 2008, the Men's Lacrosse team winning state 3 consecutive times in 2007, 2008,  and the Women's Lacrosse team 4 consecutive times in 2005, 2006, 2007, 2008.

Nevada Interscholastic Activities Association State Championships 
Lacrosse (Girls) – 2005, 2006, 2007, 2008
Lacrosse (Boys)  – 2007, 2008, 2009
Bowling (Girls) – 2009
Soccer (Boys) – 1991, 1995, 1996
Tennis (Boys) – 2001, 2002, 2003, 2005, 2008
Volleyball (Girls) – 1987
Volleyball (Boys) – 2011
Soccer (Girls) – 2004
Track ( Boys ) - 1984, 1985

Notable alumni
Greg Brower ('82) – Senator in the Nevada Senate and former United States Attorney for the District of Nevada
Annie Black ('99) - politician 
Kris Bryant ('10) – former Chicago Cubs and San Francisco Giants, current Colorado Rockies 3B/OF, 2015 NL Rookie of the Year, 2016 NL MVP, Hank Aaron Award winner, Dick Howser Trophy winner, 2016 World Series Champion
Joe Fernandez ('96) – Technology entrepreneur
Lance Gross ('99) - actor
Mark Hutchison ('81) - Lieutenant Governor of Nevada
Jonathan Jackson ('94) - former professional NFL and defunct XFL player
Jenna Jameson ('92) - adult film actress
Daniel Kucan ('88) – actor, designer, and television personality on Extreme Makeover: Home Edition
Joe Kucan ('83) – actor, director, casting director
Justin Leone ('95) – former professional MLB player
Gray Maynard (transferred) – 2-time Ohio State Champion and 3-time NCAA All-American wrestler; professional mixed martial artist, former UFC Lightweight Title Contender
Rob Meadows ('95) – serial entrepreneur
Frank Mir ('98) – Nevada State Champion wrestler; professional mixed martial arts fighter, former UFC Heavyweight Champion and Interim UFC Heavyweight Champion
Scott Piercy ('96) – PGA Tour professional golfer
Jason Reed ('86) – actor, musician
Dan Reynolds ('05) – frontman for Grammy Award-winning rock band Imagine Dragons
Gerald Riggs ('78) – former professional NFL player
Lee Scrivner – ('89) - writer, musician, professor
Adam Seward ('00) – former professional NFL player
Chasen Shreve ('08) – professional MLB player
Jason Zucker (transferred) – first professional NHL player from Nevada
Linda Bell ('86) - Nevada Supreme Court

References

External links

Official site

Clark County School District
School buildings completed in 1976
Educational institutions established in 1976
1976 establishments in Nevada
High schools in Las Vegas
Public high schools in Nevada